China Minsheng Bank, founded on January 12, 1996, in Beijing, is the first bank in China to be owned mostly by private sector enterprises. The bank was founded by Jing Shuping, a Chinese lawyer and businessman.

Minsheng Bank is well known for focusing on making loans to small-medium enterprise. It has over two hundred banking outlets throughout China and relationships with more than seven hundred banks overseas. The bank was publicly listed on the Hong Kong Stock Exchange in 2009.

Business description

Strategic positioning 
Officially established on 12 January 1996, CMBC initially formulated its strategic positioning of non-state-owned, high-tech, and large enterprises. Nonetheless, the orientation ended in failure with 8.72% of the non-performing loan rate and 40% loss of Return On Equity (ROE) until 1999. For reversing the unfavourable prospect, CMBC initiates continuous internal reformation such as the replacement of leadership in April 2000 and “the enterprise business and divisional organisation reform” in 2007. In 2009, CMBC confirmed its strategic positioning that fundamentally focuses on private, small and medium corporations and advanced technological businesses, offers moderate risk-taking and heterogeneous financial products and services, and dedicates to expanding path to profitability. In 2011, CMBC innovated its orientation by establishing “a ‘customer-focused’ scientific and strategic implementation system” for sufficient development and further interests.

See also

 Minsheng Bank Building
 Liu Yonghao

References

External links

 China Minsheng Bank's website 
 China Minsheng Bank's website 

 
Companies listed on the Shanghai Stock Exchange
Companies in the CSI 100 Index
Companies listed on the Hong Kong Stock Exchange
Banks of China
Companies based in Beijing
Banks established in 1996
H shares
Chinese brands